Energy democracy is a concept developed within the environmental justice movement that pairs the renewable energy transition with efforts to democratize the production and management of energy resources— including the social ownership of energy infrastructure, decentralization of energy systems, and expansion of public participation in energy-related policymaking. Rather than view decarbonization as a purely technological challenge, energy democracy identifies the renewable energy transition as an opportunity to redistribute political and economic power toward egalitarian ends.

Energy democracy has been endorsed by community organizations, think tanks, labor unions, and NGOs as a framework for decarbonization. The concept is also associated with a number of campaigns in Europe and North America calling for the municipalization of energy companies and democratization of their governance structures.

Principles 
The exact definition of energy democracy is contested and the term is used to refer to a diverse set of proposals, practices, and ideas. However, advocates most often define energy democracy as embodying progressive principles they believe should guide contemporary energy policy and governance— namely social ownership, public participation, and decentralization.

Social ownership 
Advocates of energy democracy support a transition toward social ownership of energy companies and infrastructure, arguing that existing privately-owned utilities are poorly-suited to undertake rapid decarbonization and address concerns of environmental justice. The call for social ownership encompasses both expansions of public ownership (i.e. municipalization and nationalization) and the promotion of forms of collective ownership (e.g. energy cooperatives).

Public participation 
Energy democracy calls for expanding public participation in the renewable energy transition and the broader functionings of the energy sector. In doing so, advocates argue that energy policy and decision-making will better incorporate local knowledge and the environmental justice concerns of local communities. Various mechanisms for public participation have been suggested, including the creation of democratically-elected energy oversight boards and the incorporation of public deliberation into the policymaking process.

Decentralization 
Solar panels, wind turbines, and other renewable energy technologies allow for energy generation to be physically decentralized; advocates of energy democracy believe this energy decentralization could be a tool for empowering local communities and deconcentrating wealth and power. By building and managing energy infrastructure at the community-scale (e.g. community wind and solar farms), communities avoid having to outsource energy generation to privately-owned utilities with regional monopolies. Additionally, advocates argue that decentralization can change community-wide relationships with energy consumption by turning community members into prosumers with a direct stake in questions of production.

Campaigns 
In 2012, a global coalition of trade unionists founded Trade Unions for Energy Democracy to organize workers in support of climate action and a just transition to renewable energy. As of 2021, the network claims a membership of 89 trade union bodies in 26 countries.

In 2021, the New York Energy Democracy Alliance joined other state advocacy organizations in forming the Public Power NY Coalition. The coalition is currently advocating for the passage of the New York Utility Democracy Act (S.B. S7243), which would municipalize the New York's private utility companies and create democratically-elected utility boards to oversee their operations.

See also

Community solar farm
Community wind energy
Economic democracy
RAPS
Soft energy path
Wadebridge Renewable Energy Network
a solar farm entity in Aus/ NZ ;  who create and facilitate co-op owned community renewable energy farms.    https://energydemocracy.net/

References

 
Distributed generation
Environmental justice
Renewable energy policy
Types of democracy